Shamoke (died 222) was a tribal chieftain who lived in Wuling Commandery (武陵郡; around present-day Changde, Hunan) in the late Eastern Han dynasty and Three Kingdoms period of China. He allied with the Shu Han state during the Battle of Xiaoting of 221–222 against the Eastern Wu state and was killed in battle.

Life
Shamoke was a chieftain among the local tribes living in the five valleys/gorges in Wuling Commandery (武陵郡; around present-day Changde, Hunan). In 221, Liu Bei, the emperor of the Shu Han state, started the Battle of Xiaoting against his ally-turned-rival Sun Quan, the ruler of the Eastern Wu state. He sent an official, Ma Liang, as an envoy to meet Shamoke and the tribal chiefs in Wuling Commandery and managed to bribe them with wealth and titles to gain their support in the war against Sun Quan. Shamoke was killed in battle in 222 when Sun Quan's forces launched a counterattack against Liu Bei's forces and dealt them a devastating defeat.

In Romance of the Three Kingdoms
Shamoke appears as a minor character in the 14th-century historical novel Romance of the Three Kingdoms, which romanticises the events before and during the Three Kingdoms period. His physical appearance is described as follows in the novel:  During the Battle of Xiaoting, he encounters the Eastern Wu general Gan Ning, who insists on participating in the battle even though he is ill at the time. When Gan Ning realises that he cannot fight Shamoke due to his condition, he tries to retreat but is killed by Shamoke, who fires an arrow that hits him in the head. Later on, when Shamoke gets caught up in the Eastern Wu forces' fire attack against the Shu Han forces, he attempts to flee the battlefield but the Eastern Wu general Zhou Tai catches up with him and kills him after a brief fight.

See also
 Lists of people of the Three Kingdoms

References

 Chen, Shou (3rd century). Records of the Three Kingdoms (Sanguozhi).
 Luo, Guanzhong (14th century). Romance of the Three Kingdoms (Sanguo Yanyi).

Year of birth unknown
222 deaths
People of Shu Han
People from Changde
Three Kingdoms people killed in battle